The 2014 Australian Swimming Championships were held from 1 to 6 April 2014 at the Brisbane Aquatic Centre in Brisbane, Queensland. They doubled up as the national trials for the Glasgow 2014 Commonwealth Games.

Qualification criteria

Below were the entry qualifying times for each event that had to be achieved after 1 January 2013 in a 50m pool.

Below were the Swimming Australia A and B qualifying times for the 2014 Commonwealth Games for each event.

Medal winners

Men's events

Legend:

Women's events

Legend:

References

Australian championships
Australian Swimming Championships
Sport in Brisbane
Swimming Championships
April 2014 sports events in Australia